The Hungarian ambassador in Beijing is the official representative of the Government in Budapest to the Government of China.

List of representatives

References 

Ambassadors of Hungary to China
China
Hungary